Max Dumesny (born 12 July 1959, in Nullawarre, Victoria) is an Australian professional Sprintcar driver. Dumesny was born and raised in Victoria but has resided in Nelson, New South Wales since the mid-1990s, although his Sprintcar carries the number V5 (for Victoria #5) that he has used throughout his career, although he has changed that to Australia 1 when he has won both the Australian Formula 500 and Australian Sprintcar Championships.

Career

Junior Classes
Dumesny started his career on motorbikes and it was generally believed that he would go on to a national scrambles career, but fate intervened on a dark night not far from home when riding his motorcycle he struck a cow that had wandered onto the road.

After recovering from injuries sustained in the crash, Dumesny decided a career on four wheels was probably a safer bet than one on two wheels and he started racing speedway in a Formula 500 at his local track, the Premier Speedway in Warrnambool. He proved to be a sensation on the 1/4-mile speedway and ended up winning the 1980 Australian Formula 500 Championship at the Western International Speedway in Melbourne, and repeating the success in 1982 at the Bibra Lake Speedway in Perth.

Sprintcars
Dumesny switched to Sprintcars in 1983/84 and had his first major win that season when he won the 1983 Wayne Fisher Memorial at the Parramatta City Raceway in Sydney. In 1984 Dumesny linked with Melbourne based motor and racing expert John Sidney, driving for Sidney's OTR (Oval Track Racing) and started driving an Australian made OTR Defender Sprintcar with instant success, winning both the Victorian and South Australian championships.

Dumesny's record in Sprintcars in Australia is almost second to none. He has won multiple state titles around the country including eight Victorian championships, as well as the South Australian, New South Wales and Queensland championships. In 1991 he became the only driver to win the Australian Sprintcar and Australian Formula 500 Championships when he won the Sprintcar title at the Carrick Speedway in Tasmania. He added a second and third national Sprintcar title in 1998 and 2002 respectively. Dumesny is also a seven-time winner of the World Series Sprintcars held in Australia, winning his first championship in 1989/90 while at his former home track in Warrnambool he has won three Grand Annual Sprintcar Classics. Dumesny's win in the 1992 Classic was the first time in the race's then 20-year history that a Victorian driver had won the event. In the years prior to his 1992 win, he had finished 3rd in 1988 and 1991, and second in 1989 and 1990. Dumesny finished second behind American Tim Kaeding in the 2014 Classic.

He has also won 32 feature races in the Easter Sprintcar Trail, a three event series held annually on the Easter long weekend at the Borderline Speedway in Mount Gambier, South Australia, and various tracks in Victoria, usually the Premier Speedway in Warrnambool, and the Avalon Raceway in Lara near Geelong.

Early in his Sprintcar career, Dumesny also travelled to the United States to race in selected World of Outlaws events as well as the famed Knoxville Nationals. His biggest success overseas came in 1985 when he won the Race of States at the 1985 Knoxville Nationals, becoming the first Australian to win the race. Since then, along with a number of other Australian drivers including his son Mitchell, he has been a regular visitor to Knoxville.

On 16 May 1992 Dumesny continued to show his versatility when he swapped his Sprintcar for a Speedcar and won the 34th Australian Speedcar Grand Prix held at the famous Sydney Showground Speedway joining such drivers as A. J. Foyt, Steve Kinser, Sleepy Tripp, Garry Rush and George Tatnell as winners of the annual event.

Sedan Racing
Max Dumesny, his longtime backer John Sidney along with longtime (and current) major sponsor Valvoline (sponsorship secured in 1988) branched out in other forms of motorsport in the early 1990s when Max drove a JSR (John Sidney Racing) prepared Oldsmobile Cutlass in the Australian NASCAR Championship, winning the 1992/93 national championship. Max would remain competitive in NASCAR, later switching to drive a Chevrolet Monte Carlo. In 2002, he co-drove with Jamie Whincup at the 2002 Queensland 500.

Dumesny also raced a JSR prepared Ford Falcon in the 1996 Australian Touring Car Championship. Dumesny finished the championship in 16th place and also raced the Falcon to 12th place in the 1996 AMP Bathurst 1000 partnered with Kerry Baily from Tasmania.

Complete Australian Touring Car results
(key) (Races in bold indicate pole position) (Races in italics indicate fastest lap)

Personal
Max Dumesny has been married to Melinda since 1986. Melinda Dumesny is the daughter of Australian Sprintcar Driver Sid Moore. Together they have four children (Mitchell, Michaela, Matt & Marcus). Both Melinda and Mitchell Dumesny, like Max, are Sprintcar drivers. Max Dumesny Motorsport also is the official agent of Continental AG's speedway tyre division in Australia. His daughter Michaela is also following the speedway tradition and has raced sprintcars, both with and without wings, before moving to Bloomington, Indiana (United States) to attend Indiana University.

In a 2014 video interview for the Sydney Speedway's YouTube channel, Dumesny confessed that after starting in Formula 500's he thought his career would last "about 5 years" before he got out, got married and had kids who would never know he had raced. By the time of the interview Dumesny had spent over 35 years in the sport and all four of his children now raced speedway.

In 2015, the Speedway Racing Association of Victoria (SRA) granted Life Membership to Max Dumesny and allocated his racing number "V5" to be only used by a "Dumesny".

Major wins
World Series Sprintcars - 1989/90, 1990/91, 1992/93, 2001/02, 2003/04, 2004/05, 2006/07
Australian Sprintcar Championship - 1991, 1998, 2002
Australian Superspeedway Championship (NASCAR) - 1992/93
Grand Annual Sprintcar Classic - 1992, 1994, 2004
Australian Formula 500 Championship - 1980, 1982
Race of States at the Knoxville Nationals - 1985
Australian Speedcar Grand Prix - 1992
Victorian Sprintcar Championship (8 times)
South Australian Sprintcar Championship - 1984, 1985, 1986, 1989, 1993, 2002
New South Wales Sprintcar Championship - 1984, 2008, 2014
Queensland Sprintcar Championship
Australian Sprintcar Masters
Australian Sprintcar Stampede
Easter Sprintcar Trail (32 Feature wins)
Krikke Boys Shootout - 2004, 2006, 2007

References

External links
Max Dumesny Motorsport
V8 Supercar stats - Conrod V8 Website
Driver database stats

1959 births
Australian sprint car drivers
Australian Touring Car Championship drivers
Living people
Racing drivers from Victoria (Australia)
Supercars Championship drivers
Garry Rogers Motorsport drivers